Rolph Stewart Grant  (15 December 1909 – 18 October 1977) was a West Indian cricketer who captained West Indies on their 1939 tour of England. He played first-class cricket for Cambridge University in 1932 and 1933, and then for Trinidad from 1934 to 1939.

Life and career
Rolph Grant was a middle-order batsman and off-spin bowler. He made his highest first-class score for Trinidad against Barbados in 1933–34, when he scored 55 and 152, top-scoring in each innings. In the 10-wicket victory over Hampshire on the 1939 tour he top-scored with 54 and took his best figures of 4 for 41 and 2 for 24. When the West Indies needed an opening batsman during the 1939 tour he took over the role, opening with Jeffrey Stollmeyer in all three Tests, with a highest score of 47.

He took over the captaincy of the West Indies team from his brother Jackie Grant. Two other brothers played cricket but without the same level of success. Rolph had not always been picked for the Cambridge University team, but he was a gifted sportsman, being a national amateur footballer and being heavyweight boxing champion for his country. Later pundits put Rolph's selection as captain down to his race. The selectors wanted a white captain and Rolph fitted that requirement. Discussing the West Indian captaincy in his history of West Indian cricket, Michael Manley described Grant as "a man of great decency and intelligence", but in his qualifications for the captaincy he was "far more importantly the son of a wealthy and powerful Trinidadian family ... It was the families who were accustomed to ruling who were assumed to produce the sons who were capable of leading." 

Grant married Margaret Kennedy in Windsor, Ontario, in 1934. They had three sons. They lived in Jamaica, where he was a director of the family company, Geddes Grant. He was also a prominent voluntary social worker, and was awarded the OBE for this work in the 1961 New Year Honours. He died in 1977.

References

1909 births
1977 deaths
Cricketers from Port of Spain
Alumni of Queen's Royal College, Trinidad
Trinidad and Tobago cricketers
West Indies Test cricketers
West Indies Test cricket captains
Cambridge University cricketers
Alumni of Christ's College, Cambridge
Officers of the Order of the British Empire
Rolph
Trinidad and Tobago people of Canadian descent